This is a partial list of places named in honor of Franjo Tuđman, the 1st President of the independent Republic of Croatia from 1990 until 1999:

Airports
Franjo Tuđman Airport, Zagreb

Bridges
Franjo Tuđman Bridge, Čapljina
Franjo Tuđman Bridge, Dubrovnik
Franjo Tuđman Bridge, Osijek

Parks and green areas
Bedekovčina
Duga Resa
Gračac
Sisak
Slunj
Velika Gorica

Pathways
Hrvatska Kostajnica
Karlovac
Makarska
Novi Vinodolski 
Samobor
Varaždin
Župa dubrovačka

Institutions
 Croatian Defence Academy Dr. Franjo Tuđman, Zagreb
 University Campus Dr. Franjo Tuđman, Split
 Elementary school in Beli Manastir
 Elementary school in Brela
 Elementary school in Knin
 Elementary school in Korenica
 Elementary school in Lički Osik
 Elementary school in Šarengrad
 Memorial school in Veliko Trgovišće
 Croatian House Dr. Franjo Tuđman, Pakrac

Streets

Beli Manastir
Bibinje
Biograd na moru
Bizovac
Čepin
Gospić
Grude
Ilok
Jasenovac
Jastrebarsko
Karlobag
Kaštela
Kistanje
Knin
Krapina
Križevci
Livno
Lobor
Lovinac
Ludbreg
Ljubuški
Marina
Međugorje
Neum
Orehovica
Pakrac
Pirovac
Podbablje
Posedarje
Požega
Rogoznica
Sibinj
Solin
Starigrad
Sukošan
Trogir
Sveta Nedelja 
Valpovo
Vir
Vukovar
Zabok
Zadar
Zadvarje
Zagvozd
Zmijavci

Squares

Benkovac
Bibinje
Bjelovar
Blato
Čačinci
Daruvar
Drniš
Đakovo
Glina
Gvozd
Hrvatska Dubica
Imotski
Jasenovac
Karlobag
Koška
Metković
Našice
Nerežišća
Novalja
Nova Bukovica
Novigrad Podravski
Novska
Nuštar
Obrovac
Okučani
Omiš
Otočac
Otok
Ogulin
Pakrac
Petrinja
Podstrana
Sinj
Skradin
Slunj
Split
Sutivan
Škabrnja
Tomislavgrad
Tovarnik
Unešić
Virovitica
Vodice
Vrbanja
Vrgorac
Vrlika
Vrpolje
Vukovar
Zaprešić
Zagreb

Waterfronts
Jasenice
Korčula
Opuzen
Orebić
Ploče
Senj
Stari Grad
Šibenik
Tisno
Sveti Filip i Jakov
Umag

References

Tuđman, Franjo
Tuđman, Franjp
Places named